By-elections to the 28th Canadian Parliament were held to fill vacancies in the House of Commons of Canada between the 1968 federal election and the 1972 federal election. The Liberal Party of Canada led a majority government for the entirety of the 29th Canadian Parliament, though their number did decrease from by-elections.

Fifteen seats became vacant during the life of the Parliament. Eleven of these vacancies were filled through by-elections, and four seats remained vacant when the 1972 federal election was called.

See also
List of federal by-elections in Canada

Sources
 Parliament of Canada–Elected in By-Elections 

1971 elections in Canada
1970 elections in Canada
1969 elections in Canada
28th